Metella may refer to:

 Caecilia Metella (disambiguation), several women born into the Caecilii Metelli family of ancient Rome
 Cornelia Metella ( BC–after 48 BC) final wife of Pompey the Great
 Malia Metella (born 1982), French swimmer, sister of Medhy
 Mehdy Metella (born 1992), French swimmer, brother of Malia

See also
Caecilii Metelli family tree